Kyle Achterhoff is a former American football coach. He served as the head football coach at Northwestern College in Orange City, Iowa from 2009 to 2015, compiling a record of 56–19.

Head coaching record

References

Year of birth missing (living people)
Living people
Northwestern Red Raiders football coaches